Jeoffrey Keith Long (born October 9, 1941) is an American former professional baseball player. Although he began his career as a pitcher, Long struggled on the mound during his first two minor league seasons and converted to first baseman in his third season to take advantage of his powerful bat.

He signed with the Cardinals in 1959 after graduating from high school in Erlanger, Kentucky. As a pitcher in his first two years in the low minors, he compiled a record of two wins and 14 defeats in 45 games, but successfully changed positions in 1961 and the following year he swatted 30 home runs for the Tulsa Oilers of the Class AA Texas League.

The Cardinals recalled him in July 1963 and he made five appearances as a pinch hitter for them that season, garnering one hit. The following year, he served as a pinch hitter and substitute first baseman and right fielder for the 1964 Redbirds through the first week of July. He collected four hits, including a double and his only MLB homer, against the Milwaukee Braves during a weekend series in May, but was restricted to pinch hitting after May 29. The Cardinals then sold his contract to the White Sox on July 7 to make room for rookie Mike Shannon. Eight days later, Long, playing left field, slipped and hurt his knee on a wet field at Fenway Park. The injury affected his play in 1964 — he would start only two more times for the White Sox — and restricted him to only 46 minor league games played in 1965. In an attempt to rehabilitate the knee, Long lost three full seasons (1966–1968) and he retired after a brief 1969 minor league comeback attempt.  All told, he appeared in 56 Major League games and collected 16 hits.

After leaving baseball, Long joined the family business, the Cincinnati Drum Service.

References

External links
Career record and playing statistics from Baseball Reference

1941 births
Living people
Arkansas Travelers players
Atlanta Crackers players
Baseball players from Kentucky
Chicago White Sox players
Jacksonville Suns players
Major League Baseball first basemen
Major League Baseball outfielders
Sportspeople from Covington, Kentucky
St. Louis Cardinals players
Tulsa Oilers (baseball) players
Winnipeg Goldeyes players